Abu Dhabi National Insurance Company PSC (ADNIC) is an insurance company based in Abu Dhabi, United Arab Emirates. It is the third largest insurer in the country as of May 2015.

ADNIC was founded in 1972 and is part of the Abu Dhabi Investment Council's portfolio of companies. The Council is the largest shareholder in the company with a 24 percent stake.

The company offers both life and nonlife insurance products in the UAE. Its main corporate offerings are in the property, marine and aviation businesses. It plans to expand its presence in the Middle East and North Africa (MENA) region and into the aerospace and SME industries.

In 2015, the company's colour-coded motor insurance offering was recognised as Best Consumer Insurance Product at the Banker Middle East UAE Product Awards.

References

External links
  

Insurance companies of the United Arab Emirates
Companies based in Abu Dhabi
Financial services companies established in 1972
Companies listed on the Abu Dhabi Securities Exchange